The England women's cricket team toured Sri Lanka to play the Sri Lanka women's national cricket team in March 2019. The tour consisted of three Women's One Day Internationals (WODIs), which formed part of the 2017–20 ICC Women's Championship, and three Women's Twenty20 International (WT20) matches.

England Women won the WODI series 3–0. The series defeat meant that Sri Lanka Women could no longer qualify directly for the 2021 Women's Cricket World Cup, progressing to the 2020 Women's Cricket World Cup Qualifier tournament instead. England Women also won the WT20I series 3–0.

Squads

Sophie Ecclestone was ruled out of England's squad, after suffering a broken hand during the WODI series against India in February 2019. Katherine Brunt was later added to England's squads.

Tour match

50-over match: Sri Lanka Women Emerging Team v England Women

WODI series

1st WODI

2nd WODI

3rd WODI

WT20I series

1st WT20I

2nd WT20I

3rd WT20I

References

External links
 Series home at ESPN Cricinfo

2017–20 ICC Women's Championship
2019 in women's cricket
2019 in Sri Lankan cricket
2019 in English cricket
cricket
International cricket competitions in 2018–19
Sri Lanka 2018-19
England 2018-19